The Fureys is an Irish male folk band from Ireland.

The Fureys has the albums When You Were Sweet Sixteen (1982) AUS #18, Steal Away (1983) AUS #45 and The First Leaves of Autumn (1986) AUS #85 all chart in Australia.

Studio albums

Singles

References

Discographies of Irish artists